Heavy Is the Head (abbreviated to h.i.t.h on the album cover) is the second studio album by British rapper Stormzy. It was released on 13 December 2019 through #Merky Records and Atlantic Records UK. The album features collaborations with Aitch, Burna Boy, Ed Sheeran, Headie One, H.E.R., and Yebba.

Heavy Is the Head was supported by the singles "Vossi Bop", "Crown", "Wiley Flow" and "Own It". "Vossi Bop" was Stormzy's first number-one song on the UK Singles Chart, while "Own It" also reached number one on the chart. Additionally, "Crown" reached the top 10 on the chart. Heavy Is the Head debuted at number two on the UK Albums Chart, behind Rod Stewart's You're in My Heart: Rod Stewart with the Royal Philharmonic Orchestra and ahead of Harry Styles' Fine Line. It eventually topped the chart on 10 January 2020.

Heavy Is the Head received widespread acclaim from critics upon release. By January 2020, it was certified Gold by the British Phonographic Industry (BPI).

Promotion
The album was promoted with numerous projections of the initials H.I.T.H around London. Stormzy officially announced the album through his social media on 19 November, revealing the track list and cover art, which shows him holding the stab proof vest featuring a black-and-white Union Jack that he wore during his set at the Glastonbury Festival 2019, designed by Banksy.

Critical reception

Upon release, Heavy Is the Head received widespread acclaim from critics. At Metacritic, which assigns a normalised rating out of 100 to reviews from mainstream critics, the album received an average score of 82, based on 17 reviews.

Carl Anka of NME described Heavy Is the Head as "a broad-reaching, genre-buckling romp that – while sometimes overreaching – never gets dull or overstays its welcome." Praising its exploration of genres and themes, Kitty Empire wrote for The Observer, "The spaciousness, punch and depth of these productions is telling, but it is a mark of [Heavy Is the Heads] artistic integrity that Stormzy manages to transcend genre (again) without sacrificing his core griminess, or losing too much in the way of accent, word choice, content or theme."

The album was shortlisted for the Mercury Prize 2020, the second time in his career.

Track listing

Sample credits
 "Rainfall" contains a sample of "Shackles (Praise You)" written by Erica Campbell, Tina Campbell and Warryn Campbell and performed by Mary Mary. The song was featured on the video game Watch Dogs: Legion under the title "Fall on My Enemies".
 "Rachael's Little Brother" contains elements of "Baby Boy" written by Cherise Roberts, Eyobed Getachew, John Horsley, Michael Brown, Michael Mugisha, Nadia Shepherd, Temi Aisida and Thelma Howell and performed by Big Brovaz.
 "Superheroes" contains an interpolation of "Someday" written by Lee Jordan and Nigel Lowis and performed by Keisha White, which is the theme song to the CBBC show The Story of Tracy Beaker.

Charts

Weekly charts

Year-end charts

Certifications

References

2019 albums
Stormzy albums